The 2022 Metro Manila Film Festival (MMFF) is the 48th edition of the annual Metro Manila Film Festival held in Metro Manila and throughout the Philippines. It is being organized by the Metropolitan Manila Development Authority (MMDA). During the festival, no foreign films are shown in Philippine theaters (excluding IMAX and 4D theaters).

Entries

Feature films

The Metro Manila Film Festival (MMFF) Executive Committee announced the first four official entries in July 2022 which were entered as script submissions. The last four entries was announced after the submission period for finished films ended on September 30, 2022.

On October 20, 2022, the last four films was announced by MMFF Executive Committee. These four additional films are finished films selected within the record high of 22 films that were submitted. Now on its 48th edition, this year theme is "Balik Saya sa MMFF 2022".

Parade of Stars

The Parade of Stars, the traditional motorcade of floats featuring the eight official entries, for the 2022 MMFF was held in Quezon City on December 21, 2022. The route traversed Quezon Avenue from Welcome Rotonda to the Quezon Memorial Circle. The parade ended on Quezon Memorial Circle.

Awards

The Gabi ng Parangal of the 2022 Metro Manila Film Festival was held at the New Frontier Theater in Quezon City on December 27, 2022.

Viva Live was the producer of the program which was hosted by Giselle Sanchez, Cindy Miranda, and BB Gandanghari.

The criteria for judging was based on a definition by Eddie Romero, National Artist for film. Jurors underwent a secret vote but were briefed on the Romero criteria and the MMFF Executive Committee tallied the votes.

The board of jurors include: Laurice Guillen (head), Jose Arturo Garcia (cochair), Tirso Cruz III (Film Development Council of the Philippines chair), Dan Fernandez, Raquel Villavicencio, Ino Manalo, Alex Cortez, Noah Tonga, Victor Pablo Trinidad and Lucky Blanco.

Major awards
Winners are listed first, highlighted in boldface, and indicated with a double dagger. Nominations are also listed if applicable.

Other awards
Manay Ichu Vera-Perez Maceda Memorial Award – Vilma Santos
Phoenix Stars of the Night – Ian Veneracion and Nadine Lustre

Multiple awards

Multiple nominations

Box office gross
MMDA Chairman Atty. Romando Artes stated that the eight entries of 2022 Metro Manila Film Festival reaches a combined box office gross of  during the official run of the film festival, with the actual box office gross figure deemed "acceptable in the industry practice". The top four grossing films in alphabetical order was also released namely: Deleter,  Family Matters, Labyu with an Accent, and Partners in Crime. He added that the inaugural edition of Metro Manila Summer Film Festival starting April 8, 2023.

References 

Metro Manila Film Festival
MMFF
MMFF
MMFF
MMFF
MMFF
December 2022 events in the Philippines
January 2023 events in the Philippines